Gasolineras Uno is a Honduran multinational petrol company. It has gas stations across Central America and in Colombia, where it is known as Biomax. Gasolineras Uno's parent is Grupo Terra.

Uno Costa Rica Group

During 2011, Gasolineras Uno established itself in Costa Rica by buying 14 former Texaco branded stations which belonged to Vitogaz, a multinational gas company with their head offices in France, therefore creating the Uno Costa Rica Group. Their presence in that country was expanded early in 2014, when it bought seven stations that belonged to Grupo Colono in the provinces of Alajuela and Limon.

References

Filling stations
Society of Honduras
Companies of Honduras
Multinational companies